The Pilmore Cup is an annual Australian rules football competition held between representative teams from the Southern Football League and the Great Southern Football League established in 2013.

The Pilmore Cup match is grouped with an U/17.5 match between the two leagues playing for the Greg Whittlesea Cup, named after Greg Whittlesea and an U/15 match played for the South Shield, named after the South Adelaide Football Club.

The Pilmore Cup is named after Barry Pilmore who has been involved with both leagues as an elite player (Southern) and an elite coach (Great Southern).

Winners

Results

2013 
The 2013 Pilmore Cup was hosted by the Southern Football League at Hickinbotham Oval on Saturday 8 June

Pilmore Cup
Great Southern Football League 20.10 (130) d Southern Football League 11.13 (79) 
Best:
Great Southern: Simon Munn, Mitchell Portlock, Scott Hunt, Jake Ashton-Place, Mathew Hodge, Thomas Derham.
Southern: Christopher Minns, Jacob Crate, Nicholas Mott, Jason Farrier, Ian Brown, Ryan Mahony.
Goals:
Great Southern: Mathew Hodge, Marcus Burdett, Jake Ashton-Place, Thomas Derham 3 each, Tyson Neale 2, Tom Pinyon, Simon Munn, Mitchell Portlock, Timothy Boyd 1 each.
Southern: Andrew Carter, Tyler Harman, Ryan Mahony 2 each, Tom McNamara, Tristan Pearce, Luke O'Brien, Mark Ruwoldt, Ian Brown 1 each.
Date: Saturday, 8 June 2013
Venue: Hickinbotham Oval

Greg Whittlesea Shield
Southern Football League 12.7 (79) d Great Southern Football League 11.4 (70) 
Best:
Southern: Joshua Penney, Shane Harvey, Brayden Heyward-Ferors, Nicholas Knight, Brayden Roberts, Jack Glazbrook.
Great Southern: Nathan Beer, Jonathan Cook, Callum Le Ray, Kurt Lindner, Andrew Pahuru, Caleb Vears .
Goals:
Southern: Jack Glazbrook 5, Jai Robinson, Shane Harvey 2 each, Jordan Monopoli, Ashley Lane, Karim Hrynkiw 1 each
Great Southern: Callum Le Ray 5, Jonathan Cook 2, Ryan Haverty, Lachlan Hourigan, Cameron Hutchens, Josh Marshall 1 each.
Date: Saturday, 8 June 2013
Venue: Hickinbotham Oval

South Shield
Great Southern Football League 7.9 (51) d Southern Football League 3.2 (20) 
Best:
Great Southern: Bradley Borrillo, Lachlan Borrillo, Jacob Wright, Damien Dowzard, Ryan Mayes, Jesse Fitzgerald.
Southern: Jackson Daniels, Corey May, Kaleb Wilden, Russell Williams, Blake Lawrence, Braydn Russell.
Goals:
Great Southern: Beau Walkom 2, Jack Weller, Bradley Borrillo, Ryan Collier, Travis Bartlett, Cody Connor 1 each.
Southern: Corey May, Austinn Wurst, Kaleb Wilden 1 each
Date: Saturday, 8 June 2013
Venue: Hickinbotham Oval

2014 

The 2014 Pilmore Cup was hosted by the Great Southern Football League at Strathalbyn Oval on Saturday 7 June.

Pilmore Cup
Great Southern Football League 12.15 (87) d Southern Football League 12.8 (80) 
Best:
Great Southern: Tom Carroll, Sam Alexopoulos, Curtis Perrey, Matthew Tonkin, Marcus Burdett, Jarrod Kellock.
Southern: Will Rivers, Chris Minns, Nick Mott, Patrick Jolly, Ciaran O'Hagan.
Goals:
Great Southern: Tom Carroll, Josh Proctor, Marcus Burdett 2 each, Sam McDonald, Sam Elliott, Scott Hunt, Curtis Perrey, Tom Pinyon, Ryan Butler 1 each.
Southern: Ciaran O'Hagan 5, Tom McNamara 4, Andrew Crate, Dwayne Ruddock, Joel Brown 1 each.
Date: Saturday, 7 June 2014
Venue: Strathalbyn Oval

Greg Whittlesea Shield
Southern Football League 12.8 (80) d Great Southern Football League 6.6 (42) 
Best:
Southern: Nicholas Frisby-Smith, Christopher Curyer, Thomas Boreham, Ryan Need, Benjamin Spencer, Bailey Sowter.
Great Southern: Todd Milford, Thomas Bonnes, Thomas Bennett, Mathew Kreuger, Jedd Rothe, Thomas Neville.
Goals:
Southern: Jake Block 3, Christopher Curyer, Matthew Thomas 2 each, Ryan Need, Adrian Albanese, Tyson Schmid, Josh Niven, Bradley Patterson 1 each
Great Southern: Jedd Rothe 3, Thomas Bennett, Jack Weller, Callum Leray 1 each.
Date: Saturday, 7 June 2014
Venue: Strathalbyn Oval

South Shield
Southern Football League 7.6 (48) d Great Southern Football League 4.14 (38) 
Best:
Southern: Travis Stone, Damon Arnold, Brody Thomson, Tate Coleman, Bowen Mitton, Daniel Buechter.
Great Southern: James Bradford, Nathan Kreuger, Jack Hourigan, Mitchell Cleggett, Thomas Pearsons, Kane Milford.
Goals:
Southern: Travis Stone 4, Robert Irra, Ryan Mountford 1
Great Southern: Jordan Boots 2, Kane Milford, Thomas Pearsons 1 each.
Date: Saturday, 7 June 2014
Venue: Strathalbyn Oval

2015 
The 2015 Pilmore Cup was hosted by the Southern Football League at Hickinbotham Oval on Saturday 6 June

Pilmore Cup
Great Southern Football League 21.19 (145) d Southern Football League 4.8 (32) 
Best:
Great Southern: Rigby Barnes, Elijah Horrocks, Charles Sharples, Brett Ellis, Matthew Tonkin, Aaron Killian.
Southern: Jonathan Eagleton, Will Rivers, Scott Carpenter, Tyson Slattery, Ben Lockett, Matthew Raitt.
Goals:
Great Southern: Elijah Horrocks, Marc Elliott 4 each, Ziggy Vitkunas 3, Jake Standfield, Tynan Keeley, Denis Iljcesen, Ryan Haverty 2 each, Rigby Barnes, Dylan Camac 1 each.
Southern: Matthew Raitt, Tyson Slattery, David Kearsley, Mitchell Minns 1 each.
Date: Saturday, 6 June 2015
Venue: Hickinbotham Oval

Greg Whittlesea Shield
Southern Football League 6.9 (45) d Great Southern Football League 4.7 (31) 
Best:
Southern: Kalem Greenwood, Zach Evreniadis, Nicholas Steele, Angus Stangewitz, Nicholas Frisby-Smith.
Great Southern: Jedd Rothe, Harry Hutton, Kane Milford, Jake Lander, Travis Bartlett, Tyson Hoffman.
Goals:
Southern: Matthew Lillis, Travis Stone, Matthew Caire, Bodie Sowter, Harrison McMillan, Jesse Pu McCarthy 1 each
Great Southern: Jedd Rothe, Cameron Cull, Connor McNeill, Cody Connor 1 each.
Date: Saturday, 6 June 2015
Venue: Hickinbotham Oval

South Shield
Great Southern Football League 10.11 (71) d Southern Football League 6.3 (39) 
Best:
Great Southern: Jake Tarca, James Bradford, Hayden Sampson, Job Colwell, Lochlan Bradley.
Southern: Ruben Flinn, Samuel Whitbread, Jonty Manuel.
Goals:
Great Southern: Jake Tarca 5, Job Colwell 3, Hayden Sampson, Billy Wade 1 each
Southern: Mackenzie Short 2, Samuel Whitbread, Bailey Marshman, Tyler Davies, Tyler Oliver 1 each.
Date: Saturday, 6 June 2015
Venue: Hickinbotham Oval

2016 

The 2016 Pilmore Cup was hosted by the Great Southern Football League at Strathalbyn Oval on Saturday 11 June.

Pilmore Cup
Great Southern Football League 24.5 (149) d Southern Football League 14.10 (94) 
Best:
Great Southern: Tyson Neale, Dylan Camac, Curtis Perrey, Ben Simounds, Sam Alexopoulos, Luke Button.
Southern: Will Rivers, Nick Mott, Samuel Smith, Shane Heatley, Christopher Barns, Samuel Tharaldsen.
Goals:
Great Southern: Ben Simounds 6, Tyson Neale 4, Marc Elliott, Joshua Vick, Tom Pinyon 3 each, Luke Button, Shaun Maxfield, Thomas Ferguson, Bradley Clarke, Braden Altus 1 each.
Southern: Samuel Smith 5, Denis Iljcesen 4, Samuel Tharaldsen, Christopher Barns, Nick Mott, Dwayne Ruddock, Christopher Bradwell 1 each.
Date: Saturday, 11 June 2016
Venue: Strathalbyn Oval

Greg Whittlesea Shield
Great Southern Football League 14.10 (94) d Southern Football League 5.1 (31) 
Best:
Great Southern: Bradley Borrillo, Darcy Clifford, Joshua Strangroome, Kane Milford, Cody Connor, Jackson Elmes.
Southern: Bradley Warner, Jack Fitzpatrick, Cooper McRae, Keelan Boehm, Mark Larritt, Robert Kernick.
Goals:
Great Southern: Lachlan Borrillo 3, Jackson Elmes, Bradley Borrillo, Scott Kilgallon, Mitchell Cleggett 2 each, Cody Connor, Kane Milford, Joshua Strangroome 1 each.
Southern: Keelan Boehm 4, Ethan Millen 1.
Date: Saturday, 11 June 2016
Venue: Strathalbyn Oval

South Shield
Great Southern Football League 6.7 (43) d Southern Football League 2.8 (20) 
Best:
Great Southern: Jake Austin, Jack Fitzgerald, Lachlan Costello, Marcus Lippett, Thomas Neville.
Southern: Kyle Jongenelis, Mackenzie Short, Isaac Osborne-O'Keefe, Shane Pettiford, Harry Spacie, Alexander Marra.
Goals:
Great Southern: Jack Fitzgerald, Aaron Douglass 2 each, Thomas Neville, Matthew Roberts 1 each
Southern: Mackenzie Short.
Date: Saturday, 11 June 2016
Venue: Strathalbyn Oval

2017 

The 2017 Pilmore Cup was hosted by the Southern Football League at Morphett Vale Memorial Oval on Saturday 10 June.

Pilmore Cup
Southern Football League 14.9 (93) d Great Southern Football League 10.9 (69) 
Best:
Southern: Michael Galley, Michael Shearer, Danny Irvine, Steven Copestick, Michael Smith, Scott O'Shaughnessy
Great Southern: Thomas Derham, Hamish Tonkin, Ryan Sherry, Sean Beath, Scott Ogilvie, Cameron Hutchens
Goals:
Southern: Samuel Smith 4, Michael Galley, Dennis Iljcesen, Troy Johnson, Jacob Crate, Tyler Harman 2 each
Great Southern: Tom Pinyon, Ryan Sherry, Thomas Derham 2 each, James Hutchinson, Ryan Mayes, Tyson Slattery, Ben Simounds 1 each
Date: Saturday, 10 June 2017
Venue: Morphett Vale Memorial Oval

Greg Whittlesea Shield
Great Southern Football League 12.4 (76) d Southern Football League 7.8 (50) 
Best:
Great Southern: Daniel Marr, Ryleigh Crombie, Jack Fitzpatrick, Jack Burns, Sam Renney, Kane Andrewartha.
Southern: Callum Gaspari, Blake Clark, Chris Hunter, Luke Calderbank, Tyler Davies, Zachary Williams.
Goals:
Great Southern: Jackson Dalitz 3, Logan Payne, Syed Hansen 2 each, Liam Hutchinson, Liam Stirling, Jake Tarca, Daniel Marr, Jack Burns 1 each.
Southern: Luke Calderbank 4, Tyler Davies, Nicholas McLean, Bailey Marshman 1 each.
Date: Saturday, 10 June 2017
Venue: Morphett Vale Memorial Oval

South Shield
Great Southern Football League 8.2 (50) d Southern Football League 4.9 (33) 
Best:
Great Southern: Shannon Jones, Matthew Roberts, James Hurrell, Arlo Draper, John Morris.
Southern: Nicholas Kraemer, Kyle Daris, Cooper Gilbert, George Chandler, Harry Spacie.
Goals:
Great Southern: Adam Terrall 2, Cooper Rogers, Jaspar Prusa, Arlo Draper, Brodie Niessen, Luke Goodieson, Jett Holberton 1 each
Southern: Cooper Gilbert, Michael Comley, Declan Henty-Smith, Nicholas Kraemer 1 each.
Date: Saturday, 10 June 2017
Venue: Morphett Vale Memorial Oval

2018 

The 2018 Pilmore Cup was hosted by the Great Southern Football League at Strathalbyn Oval on Saturday 11 June.

Pilmore Cup
Southern Football League 17.7 (109) d Great Southern Football League 15.8 (98) 
Best:
Southern: Josh Vandermeer, Neil Reeve, Adrian Albanese, Damon Arnold, David Kearsley, Toby McAllister.
Great Southern: Benjamin Davis, Callum Tonkin, Lachlan Mathews, Matthew Merrett, Curtis Perrey, Michael Corbett.
Goals:
Southern: Mitchell Johnson 4, Damon Arnold 3, Nicholas Mott, Samuel Smith, Josh Albanese, Josh Vandermeer 2 each, Daniel Trevena, Benjamin Rossi 1 each
Great Southern: Benjamin Davis, Brett Ellis, Curtis Perrey, Bradley Merrett, Marc Elliott 2 each, Callum Tonkin, Jamie Smith, Michael Corbett, Sean Beath, Caleb Howell
Date: Saturday, 9 June 2018
Venue: Strathalbyn Oval

Greg Whittlesea Shield
Great Southern Football League 15.13 (103) d Southern Football League 9.4 (58) 
Best:
Great Southern: Lachlan Williams, Zachary Dowling, Mani Draper, Ashley Goodieson, Jayden Turner, Benjamin Hamilton.
Southern: Lachlan Wethers, Luke Calderbank, James Hay, Zachary Williams, Shaye Connolly, Bradley Strapps.
Goals:
Great Southern: Mani Draper 7, Jackson Dalitz 3, Samuel Bentley, Liam Stirling 2 each, Matthew Bray 1.
Southern: Luke Calderbank 4, Nicholas Robertson 2, Hayden Kernahan, Aidan King, Bradley Strapps 1 each.
Date: Saturday, 9 June 2018
Venue: Strathalbyn Oval

Players

Both Leagues 
Two players have played for both teams in the Pilmore Cup

Southern Football League

Great Southern Football League

Coaches

Senior Game

Under 17.5 Game

Under 15 Game

Records

Most Games Played 
Curtis Perrey of the Great Southern Football League is the only player to have appeared in all 5 Pilmore Cup matches.

Most Represented Club

Medals

Kevin Curran Medal (GSFL Senior) 
The player judged best on field for the Great Southern Football League in the Senior Game is awarded the Kevin Curran Medal.

Terry Thompson Medal (GSFL U/17.5) 
The player judged best on field for the Great Southern Football League in the Under 17.5 game is awarded the Terry Thompson Medal.

Neville Miller Medal (GSFL U/15) 
The player judged best on field for the Great Southern Football League in the Under 15 game is awarded the Neville Miller Medal.

Junior Match Players

2013

Greg Whittlesea Cup (U/17.5)
Southern: Blake Carter (MV), Jack Glazbrook (MV), Shane Harvey (BDOS), Brayden Heyward-Ferors (FH), Karim Hrynkiw (HV), Chase Johnson (Noar), Troy Johnson (Noar), Nicholas Knight (BDOS), Kostas Kontos (BDOS), Ashley Lane (HV), Elliot Modra (FH), Jordan Monopoli (Hack), Ryan Need (Cove), Joshua Penney (HV), Jai Robinson (MV), Brayden Roberts (FH), Nicholas Ruddock (HV), Tain Smelt (HV), Brock Syme (MV), Dylan Trezise (Cove), Josh Vandermeer (FH), Eyre White (Rey).

Great Southern: Nathan Beer, Matthew Bergamaschi, Thomas Boxer, Daniel Cleggett, Jonathan Cook, Ryan Haverty, Frazer Hayward, Lachlan Hourigan, Cameron Hutchens, James Hutchinson, Nicholas Lawrie, Callum Le Ray, James Ledgard, Kurt Lindner, Josh Marshall, Daniel McNicol, Aaron Noske, Andrew Pahuru, Cameron Pearce, Joel Van De Leur, Caleb Vears, Zachary Watson.

South Shield (U/15) 
Great Southern: Cohan Bartlett, Steven Bartlett, Travis Bartlett, Jordan Boots, Bradley Borrillo, Lachlan Borrillo, Cody Bradshaw, Ryan Collier, Cody Connor, Jack Crispin, Cody Davenport, Damien Dowzard, Jesse Fitzgerald, Tyler Follett, Tyson Hoffmann, Tyson Levy, Billy Ludlow, Liam Magor, Ryan Mayes, Jesse McKinnon, Connor Mellow, Kane Milford, Thomas Pearsons, Beau Walkom, Jack Weller, Harrison Williams, Jacob Wright.

Southern: Josh Buckney (Mar), Jackson Daniels (PN), Caleb Dearman (HV), Zach Evreniadis (HV), Jason Goss (FH), Joshua Heading (FH), Jack Heffernan (Cove), Michael Henly (FH), Rory Holman (Noar), Richard Hore (OSBL), Blake Lawrence (Rey), Corey May (Edw), Mitchell Peat (PN), Christopher Quinsey (MVP), Braydn Russell (Rey), Nicholas Scholl-Geisler (CB), James Smitheram (Noar), Reece Staker (FH), Cameron Wall (Rey), Kaleb Wilden (Rey), Russell Williams (MVP), Austinn Wurst (Noar).

2014

Greg Whittlesea Cup (U/17.5)
Great Southern: Calvin Bache, Travis Bartlett, Thomas Bennett, Matthew Bergamaschi, Thomas Bonnes, Daniel Cleggett, Bradley Genockey, Jaamye Hopgood, James Hutchinson, Mathew Kreuger, Jack Lang, Callum Leray, Bryn Loots, Todd Milford, Thomas Neville, Thomas Osborne, Jedd Rothe, Justin Schindler, Joshua Simounds, Caleb Vears, Zachary Watson, Jack Weller.

Southern: Adrian Albanese (FH), Jake Block (Rey), Daniel Bode (MV), Thomas Boreham (Ald), Jarryd Brown (BDOS), Zakaria Cavouras (FH), Drew Crichton (BDOS), Christopher Curyer (HV), Casey Davies (FH), Nicholas Frisby-Smith (HV), Brayden Heyward-Ferors (FH), Hayden Kari (HV), Benjamin Millman (Hack), Ryan Need (Cove), Josh Niven (BDOS), Brady O'Hanlon (Ald), Bradley Patterson (FH), Tyson Schmid (BDOS), Bailey Sowter (Rey), Benjamin Spencer (CB), Patrick Sperling (FH), Matthew Thomas (CB).

South Shield (U/15) 
Southern: Damon Arnold (Rey), Nathan Beenham (FH), Daniel Buechter (Noar), Tate Coleman (HV), Brandon Deroussent (MV), Dylan Gates (Noar), Jason Goss (FH), William Gregory (Rey), Jack Heffernan (Cove), Robert Irra (OSBL), Connor Lock (MV), Jonty Manuel (Rey), Christian McDonald (Rey), Cameron McGree (Rey), Bowen Mitton (Cove), Ryan Mountford (FH), Bailey Snelling (Noar), Kennedy Stewart (OSBL), Travis Stone (Ald), Brody Thomson (Rey), Eric Tink (MV), Matthew Walton (HV).

Great Southern: Jordan Boots, James Bradford, Indiana Burns, Mitchell Cleggett, Nicholas Dowling, Liam Fitt, Zachery Hodges, Jack Hourigan, Liam Hutchinson, Tarik Illingworth, Daniel Jokic, Nathan Kreuger, Billy Ludlow, Ryan Mayes, Ryan McCurrach, Connor McNeill, Kane Milford, Thomas Pearsons, Jake Tarca, Billy Wade, Samuel Whitbread, Lachlan Whittlesea.

References

2013 establishments in Australia